Having returned to Division 3 and celebrating 125 years of competitive rugby, the ‘Fera finished in 6th place, the highest level to date in the National League.
The season began early with six wins and three defeats into October. This was similar to the promotion season a year before, the defeats being two friendlies versus Glamorgan County and Welsh Cup holders (shortly to be League Champions) Neath. Glynneath home was the other. In this run was a comprehensive first ever win at Seven Sisters at the 25th time of asking. This performance was one of the best of the season, when the ‘Fera outplayed respected opponents in every facet of the game, not allowing any opportunity for the home team to make any impact, and dominating proceedings throughout.  The Swansea Valley Cup began with a Preliminary Round win over Glais 29–7.
The remaining October games were against who would prove to be the final top three sides Tondu, Skewen and Kenfig Hill. Having played 12 games in 8 weeks did leave a mark against these well organised sides, Ystalyfera settling in 5th position out of 12 in the Division. In November, being the highest placed Swansea Valley side, success in the Cup competition was anticipated, however on a wet night at Vardre plans went astray and despite a late fight back the semi-final game was lost 14–20. December started with a hard earned 12–9 victory away at Bryncoch. A 2nd Round Welsh Plate defeat against in form Skewen, was followed by a commendable boxing day ‘revenge’ 6–5 victory at Glynneath. Four home games in January and February saw capable wins versus Briton Ferry, Seven Sisters and Cwmavon, losing to the well structured Tondu side. Throughout the remainder of the season, only two more wins would be achieved, both at home.
Defeats away at Brynamman and at Nantyffyllon were close run affairs, the ‘Fera team more than earning the right to claim victory in both games. In summary consolidation at the higher level augur's well for the club, onwards and upwards being the order of the day.   

Both Dane Clancy and Damian James scored over 100 points, the referee in the final game at Nantyffyllon denying Damian the higher total and a win for the club.
Compensation for Damian can be the most tries scored (11).
The young pack more than held its own against some big and well experienced opponents, the backs giving their best against well drilled and organised sides.
Captain was the ever reliable Paul Davies for the third time, he and other mainstream players like Mathew Scott, Steffan Jones, Gareth James and Phillip Thomas (to mention a few), were troubled by injury and it was heartening that the squad was big and strong enough to deal with these setbacks and finish in the top half of the table.
Whilst the commitment and efforts of the younger members of the side can be recognised and deems well for the future, older stalwarts do provide much needed and welcomed help and support for colleagues, coaches and Team Manager alike.
No less than six ex-captains played this season.

Players Player of the year was Jonathan Williams and the Supporters favourite was Jesse Patton.

National league division 3 south west

Ystalyfera 2009/10 Season Results

Ystalyfera 2009/10 Season Player Stats

References

Sport in Neath Port Talbot